Hector Silva airstrip  is an airport located in Cayo District serving Belmopan, the capital city of Belize. The runway is on the northern edge of the city off the George Price Highway, and has a small terminal building.

Belize Defence Forces use the airstrip for temporary landing facilities for their aircraft. It was expanded by the British army in 2002, in order to accept larger planes such as the Lockheed C-130 Hercules.

Airline and destinations

See also

Transport in Belize
List of airports in Belize

References

External links
OpenStreetMap - Belmopan
FallingRain - Belmopan Airport

Aerodromes in Belize - pdf

Airports in Belize